Playland, often called Rye Playland and also known as Playland Amusement Park, is an amusement park located in Rye, New York, along the Long Island Sound. Built in 1928, the  park is owned by the Westchester County government. Beginning with the 2018 season, STANDARD AMUSEMENTS LLC has been contracted to operate the park.

History

Late 19th and early 20th centuries

In the late 19th and early 20th centuries, Playland's waterfront area of Westchester County along the Long Island Sound was the site of a growing collection of recreational developments, including hotels, resorts, and "amusement areas". Local residents concerned about what a county report described as "unsavory crowds" induced the Westchester County Park Association to purchase two existing theme parks, Rye Beach and Paradise Park, and planned a local-government-sponsored amusement park in their stead.

Frank Darling, a veteran park manager with experience at Coney Island and the British Empire Exhibition at Wembley, was hired to design and run the new park, called Playland. The well-known NYC architectural firm Walker & Gillette and landscape architect Gilmore D. Clarke were commissioned to produce a comprehensive design of both buildings and grounds, making Playland the first planned amusement park in the country.

Construction commenced in September 1927, and was completed in six months. The park began operation on May 26, 1928. Rides that were operating on Playland's opening day included the Grand Carousel, Derby Racers, and the Dragon Coaster. The Airplane Coaster was added in 1928 while the Casino opened in 1929.

Late 20th century
In 1966, a major fire at the amusement park claimed some of Rye Playland's all-time classic attractions, including the original Bumper Car ride and the "Magic Carpet" Funhouse.

The Marriott Corporation managed the park in 1981 and 1982 as part of a two-year experimental period. During those two seasons, the park was run at a loss in excess of $5 million. Westchester County took over operation in 1983.

Playland was declared a National Historic Landmark in 1987. At the time, it was the United States' only Art Deco amusement park.

21st century

By 2001, Playland was Westchester's most visited park, seeing one million visitors that year. For the 2002 season, Playland unveiled three new rides: the Kite Flyer, Crazy Mouse, and Sky Skater. Until the beginning of the 2002–2003 National Hockey League season, the New York Rangers practiced at the Playland Ice Casino. Currently, the hockey team from Manhattanville College, located in nearby Purchase, plays its home games at Playland.

In 2012, Hurricane Sandy claimed parts of Playland's boardwalk, flooded and caused substantial damage to the Ice Casino, and scattered debris throughout Read Sanctuary.

In May 2016, the Westchester County Board of Legislators voted 13–4 to give control of the park to a management company called Standard Amusements. Standard Amusements agreed to invest $27.5 million into the park, which it will manage for 30 years. Westchester County maintains ownership of the park, and will receive an annual base rent and 8% of the park's profits after Standard Amusements has recouped its initial investment.

In 2019, Playland unveiled its first ride since 2008, a Disk'O half-pipe made by Zamperla. Playland did not operate its 2020 season due to the COVID-19 pandemic.

In 2022, Playland began its $125 million 5-year revitalization project. 
2022 saw the rebuild of the Derby Racer canopy, new & updated bathrooms across the park, new & updated midway games, as well as 3 new rides- Catch N' Air, Old Rye Motorbike Factory, and the Tornado.

Attractions
Admission to Playland is free for Westchester residents who wish to observe the attractions. However, visitors must pay for a wristband that will give them all-day access to ride all of the attractions. Non-Westchester residents must pay admission to get inside Playland and an additional fee for the wristband. Westchester residents generally also pay a lower price for the wristbands than non-Westchester residents. To keep the price of each ride low, Westchester County's government offers sponsorships to businesses in exchange for annual naming rights for a ride, in addition to sponsorships for concerts, fireworks, and revues.

Walker & Gillette's asymmetrical beaux arts plan integrated Playland's three major components. The first component, a swimming park, is defined by a semi-elliptical beach, boardwalk, and arcade. At the center of this arcade, a Spanish Revival bathhouse and pool terminates the automobile approach along Playland Parkway and its twin towers frame a view of Long Island Sound. The second component, an amusement park, is laid out along an axial landscaped mall at roughly 90 degrees to the Parkway approach. An entrance plaza with central fountain at the beach end of this axis is defined by corner pavilions and anchored by a casino and ice rink building. The axial mall is flanked by colonnades which serve to visually organize the various rides, games, and restaurants on each outboard side. A midway cross-axis terminates in a gate at the large parking lot on its inland end and at a promontory at its waterside end. The main axis terminates in a 100 foot tall Music Tower that now has a performance stage at its base. All original amusement park buildings are in an Art Deco style. The third component, a boating lake, lies beyond the tower. Its boathouse consists of two pavilions symmetrically flanking a central colonnade, facing a terrace and boat dock and the lake.

Playland is home to the "Grand Carousel", a 1915 Mangels-Carmel carousel. It has four rows with 48 jumpers, 18 standers and three chariots. It was originally in New Haven, Connecticut, and moved to Playland when the park opened in 1927. The Grand Carousel has a rare band organ built by the Gavioli company in Italy. The organ enclosure features two male figures that strike bells in time to the music while the central female figure moves a baton. The Grand Carousel contains designs including those on the horses that are completely hand-carved and painted by Charles Carmel from Brooklyn, New York. The horses possess many unique traits that include elaborate "fish scale" blankets, inlaid gemstones, armor and lolling tongues on several.

Playland is also home to one of only three still in existence. The Derby Racer was built in 1927 for Playland by Prior & Church with horses carved by Marcus Charles Illions, a turn of the century New York carousel horse carver. The Derby Racer rotates at  - three times the speed of a normal carousel. The horses move back and forth as well as up and down, simulating a true gallop as it races around the track. The other "Derby Racing Carousels" are located at Cedar Point, in Sandusky, Ohio; and Blackpool Pleasure Beach, in Blackpool, Lancashire, United Kingdom. Playland also features an upcharge Go Kart track.

Roller coasters

Thrill rides

Dark rides

Family rides

Kiddyland 
Kiddyland is a section with children's rides in the southwestern section of Playland. Its rides include:

 Antique Cars
 Boat Ride
 Convoy
 Crazy Submarine
 Flying Dragons
 Fun Slide
 Himalaya
 Jolly Caterpillar 
 Jump n' Bean
 Jungle Jamin
 Kiddy Carousel
 Kiddy Scrambler
 Kiddy Whip - a smaller whip ride
 Motorcycle Jump
 Mushroom Ride
 Playland Express - a ridable miniature railway
 Red Baron
 Slime Bucket
 Sun and Moon
 Swing Around

Casino 
The "Ice Casino", built in 1929, originally contained a main ice rink as well as a full dance floor on the second floor that functioned as a dance hall through the 1940s and '50s. It also had a full service fine-dining restaurant and an outdoor café. It had smaller dining rooms upstairs for upscale private dinners. A renovation in the 1970s added a kiddie rink as well as a mid-sized ice rink. A renovation to the main ice rink that included a new surface, boards and glass was completed in 2007 for the Empire State Games.

Free entertainment

Playland features entertainment performances on its main stage on the north side of the park towards Manursing Lake. 2006 included the dance show Oh-Zone as well as Magic and Spice featuring magician Brendon Yancey. In 2007, it had New York Nights and Shakin' at the "High School Hop", a Grease-style performance. In 2008, dance shows included I Hear America Singing, a mix of new pop songs, and Summer Cruisin, a mish-mash of 1950s and 1960s music.

There is also strolling entertainment including kids dance and singing shows, costumed characters and drum acts that occur multiple times a day.

Playland offers fireworks on Friday nights.

Concert series

Playland features a free concert series every summer that is sponsored by tri-state radio stations, Pepsi, CulinArt, Manhattan Beer Distributors, Westchester County and the Westchester County Parks Department. The free concerts are usually on Thursdays and Fridays in July and August.

In 2007, Plain White T's performed on July 31, Bowling for Soup on August 9, and Teddy Geiger on August 23. The Plain White T's attracted a very large young crowd.

In 2008, four free concerts were scheduled at Rye Playland. On May 24, the new Menudo performed. On July 18, Michelle Williams of Destiny's Child, George Lamond, Kim Sozzi and DJ Serg performed. On August 7, second runner up on American Idol, Elliott Yamin, performed. Finally, on August 14, British pop star Natasha Bedingfield performed to a capacity crowd despite the rainy weather.

In 2010, Shontelle performed for a very large, young crowd on August 4.

Past free concerts at the park include Joan Jett, Lifehouse, Cyndi Lauper, The Bangles, Daniel Bedingfield, Marky Mark and the Funky Bunch, and Cheap Trick in 2004. Additionally, around 2010, popular 80's artists such as Pat Benatar and Flock of Seagulls played the park.

Former attractions

Flat Rides

Dark Rides

Roller coasters

Emergency services
The Westchester County Police provides law enforcement services throughout the year, but the park is only officer-patrolled on a 24-hour basis from April to October. In addition to County Police, the park employs seasonal park rangers. Uniformed park rangers work under the supervision of county police officers to maintain a safe and enjoyable atmosphere in the county's parks. They assist park users, provide information on park rules and procedures, help in searches for lost children, and make regular security checks of buildings and facilities.

Westchester County Parks Emergency Medical Service provides basic life support services to the guests and employees of the park, and maintains the park's two first aid stations. Paramedic and ambulance transport services are provided through Port Chester-Rye-Rye Brook Emergency Medical Service. The Rye Fire Department handles all fire and rescue calls at Playland.

Incidents

Dragon Coaster
 In 1988, an 8-year-old girl choked to death while chewing gum on the ride.

Mind Scrambler
 On May 22, 2004, a 7-year-old girl from New Rochelle was killed when she fell out of the ride after she opened her restraining bar.
 On June 29, 2007, a 21-year-old female park employee from White Plains was killed when the ride was started by a second employee while the victim was still assisting guests with their safety restraints. Park officials stated that a safety precaution (put in place after the 2004 Mind Scrambler incident) was not followed. A report issued by the State's Labor Department on August 24, 2007, stated that the ride operators were running the ride improperly. The ride owner was cited for providing inadequate training. Due to this incident the Mind Scrambler was closed permanently.

The Whip
 On August 18, 1938, a 19-year-old man was killed after being flung off The Whip.

Wild Mouse
 On July 8, 1984, six people were taken to the hospital after suffering injuries when one of the trains they were riding in collided into another. The ride was shut down for investigation and later reopened. Park officials stated that a mechanical failure was the cause of the accident.

Ye Old Mill
 On August 3, 2005, a 7-year-old boy from Norwalk, Connecticut died of blunt force trauma to the head after he climbed out of a boat on the Ye Old Mill ride, where he became trapped underwater by a conveyor belt. The victim's family sued the county that owned Playland, and on March 24, 2009, the defendants were ordered to pay US$1.25 million, as well as create a scholarship in the victim's name. The scholarship will be awarded annually to Playland employees who exhibit excellence in safety and customer service.

Accidental drowning
 On July 4, 2006, a 43-year-old woman from Queens drowned after walking into a man-made lake that is off-limits to swimmers. An autopsy showed the victim had a blood alcohol level seven times the legal limit.

See also

 List of National Historic Landmarks in New York
 National Register of Historic Places listings in southern Westchester County, New York
 Playland Parkway
 List of incidents at independent amusement parks

References

External links

 Official website
 

Amusement parks in New York (state)
Buildings and structures in Rye, New York
Tourist attractions in Westchester County, New York
National Historic Landmarks in New York (state)
National Register of Historic Places in Westchester County, New York
Beaches of Westchester County, New York
Long Island Sound
1928 establishments in New York (state)
Buildings and structures on the National Register of Historic Places in New York (state)